Bonellitia scobina is a species of sea snail, a marine gastropod mollusk in the family Cancellariidae, the nutmeg snails.

Distribution
This type of sea snail was documented in the eastern shore of Australia, more specifically in the South-East region around Sydney.

References

Cancellariidae
Gastropods described in 1906